Lee Dong-hae (born October 15, 1986), referred to as Donghae, is a South Korean singer, songwriter, composer and actor. He became a trainee under SM Entertainment after winning a prize at SM's Youth Best Contest in 2001. After four years of training, Donghae debuted as a member of boy group Super Junior in November 2005. Since then, he has risen to prominence due to the group's success on the Asian music scene and further participated in the group's project groups Super Junior-M, Super Junior-D&E. He is one of the first four Korean artists to appear on Chinese postage stamps.

Career

1986–2011: Early life and career beginnings
Donghae was born in Mokpo, South Jeolla Province, South Korea. His grandmother helped his mother to deliver him. He has an elder brother named Lee Dong-hwa. When he was young he wanted to become a football player but his dad wanted him to be a singer since he gave up of his dream to become one himself. In 2001, Donghae signed with SM Entertainment after winning a prize at SM's Youth Best Contest.<ref name=trainee>"李东海个人资料_CCTV.com_中国中央电视台" . Ent.cctv.com. Retrieved 2011-12-25 </ref> Under SM Entertainment, Donghae was put in singing, dancing, and acting lessons, and was then recruited into a five-member boy band Smile, with future bandmate Leeteuk, but the idea was soon dropped. In 2004, Donghae, along with Leeteuk, was put into a twelve-member boy band named Super Junior 05.

Donghae officially debuted as part of 12-member project group Super Junior 05 on 6 November 2005."SM Unveils 12-Membered Boy Group Named Super Junior"  Arirang.co.kr. 27 October 2005. Retrieved 2011-12-25 He made his acting debut in Super Junior's horror documentary Mystery 6, broadcast in early 2006. The documentary surrounds Donghae and his peculiar ability to see and feel ghosts. In August 2006, Donghae played the role of a human turned cyborg in the Korean version of BoA's music video drama, "Key of Heart".

In 2007, he played a role in Attack on the Pin-Up Boys.

In April 2008, a Super Junior's Chinese subgroup Super Junior-M was formed with Donghae and fellow members Hangeng, Siwon, Ryeowook, Kyuhyun, Henry, Zhou Mi. Their debut album, Me, debuted in Korea's MIAK Monthly Charts as #10  and reached #1 in China's Top in Music chart.

In 2010, he played in a drama It's Okay, Daddy's Girl.

In April 2011, Donghae co-starred again with fellow member Siwon, in the Taiwanese drama Skip Beat! with Ivy Chen. Joongang Daily. 15 December 2011. Retrieved 2012-03-27 He also sang the ending theme song, "This is Love," which also featured fellow Super Junior-M member Henry.

Donghae sang the theme song for the 2011 8th Asia Song Festival, "Dreams Come True", with Seohyun of Girls' Generation

On December 16, 2011, a Super Junior subgroup D&E was formed with Donghae and fellow member Eunhyuk. They began the project with released debut single Oppa, Oppa. The single was also released in Japanese, in April 2012.

2012–2015: Acting roles, Lyrics Writing and Composing, Military enlistment

In May 2012, Donghae was cast in the title role of Mr. Hedgehog in the romantic comedy Miss Panda and Mr. Hedgehog. Donghae also sang his character Go Seung-gi's theme song "Plz Don't", which was released online on 20 August.

In June 2012, Donghae reunited with Super Junior for their sixth studio album, Sexy, Free & Single. In the repackaged edition of the album, re-titled Spy, Donghae co-wrote the lyrics for "Only U" with Leeteuk; and co-composed "Haru" with Urban Zakapa's Kwon Soon-il.

In December 2012, Donghae joined SM new dance project group, S.M. The Performance, contributing his dance skill to covered performance for Zedd's Spectrum on SBS Gayo Daejeon on December 29 and later the song released digitally on December 30.

Due to a scheduling conflict, Donghae turned down the casting offer for horror film 'Tunnel'; however, he was later cast as the star lead in the short film The Youth-The Rumor. Donghae was to join the cast of Quiz of God Season 4 as Han Si Woo, a medical researcher. The show aired its first episode on May 18.

In August 2014, Super Junior's seventh album, Mamacita was released, where Donghae also contributing music and lyrics to their second lead single, "Shirt".

In March 2015, D&E's first Korean album, The Beat Goes On was released. Donghae was participated in the album production teamed up with producers Team One Sound to writing lyrics and composing two songs, the lead single "Growing Pains" and side single "Mother" .

In July 2015, Super Junior special album, Devil was released to celebrate the group's 10th anniversary. Donghae also participated in the album production with writing lyrics and composing two songs, "Don't Wake Me Up" and "Alright".

On September 2, 2015, S.M. Entertainment announced that Lee Donghae would enlist as a conscripted policeman on October 15, 2015. Donghae entered through the Nonsan Army Training Center in Chungnam on his birthday.

2017–present: Returning to Super Junior and Super Junior Promotions
Donghae completed his military service on 14 July 2017 after serving for 21 months. Following the completion of his mandatory military service, he and fellow Super Junior member Eunhyuk, held a fan meeting for Super Junior-D&E Hello Again'' on July 23 at Sejong University Daeyang Hall and participated on SM TOWN Live World Tour VI in Japan on July 27–28.

On 27 September 2017, Super Junior's website began a countdown to November 6 -the date of their 12th anniversary- announcing it as their comeback date for their 8th album. "SJ Returns – Super Junior Real Comeback Story," a reality show featuring the idol group's development of their album, began airing on 9 October. Donghae participated in the album production of where he co-wrote with Eunhyuk and JDUB as well as co-composed with JDUB for a pre-release single "One More Chance". On 30 October 2017, the music video for "One More Chance" was released as a pre-release track for the upcoming album. On 6 November 2017 Super Junior's 8th Album "Play", was released in honor of Super Junior's 12th anniversary.

In 2017, Donghae and Eunhyuk announced their comeback as the duo group Super Junior D&E in Japan, where they would kick off a series of monthly release of Japanese singles where they will be releasing one song every month starting November 2017, and by sometime later 2018, compile all the released singles into a full Japanese album. On November 29, they released the first Japanese single of the series, titled "Here We Are". One month later, on December 26, D&E released the second Japanese single titled "You don't go". On January 31, 2018, SUPER JUNIOR-D&E released the third Japanese single titled "If You", written and composed by Donghae. On February 28, 2018, SUPER JUNIOR-D&E's released the fourth Japanese single titled "Circus". On March 28, 2018, the duo continued their ongoing Japanese series, the fifth single, titled "Lose It ". The music video was released in 3 episodes. The episodes were released on March 28, 2018, March 30, 2018, and April 1, 2018. On April 2, 2018, the full version of the music video was later released.

In December 2017, Donghae collaborated with Cadillac, where Donghae co-written lyrics and composed "Perfect" soundtrack for Cadillac.

Due to the success of SJ Returns, in January 2018, Donghae and his fellow Super Junior members started a new variety program Super TV in which varied entertainment formats are re-created and twisted in Super Junior's own way. The first season was released with 12 episodes where Donghae gained the nickname '0-hae' due to his lack of variety skills.

Personal life
On September 2, 2015, SM Entertainment announced that Lee Dong-hae would enlist as a conscripted policeman on October 15, 2015. Donghae entered through the Nonsan Army Training Center in Chungnam on his birthday. He was discharged on July 14, 2017.

Discography

Singles

Other appearances

Lyrics and Composition

Filmography

Film

Television series

Television shows

Web shows

Awards and nominations

References

External links

  

1986 births
Japanese-language singers of South Korea
Mandarin-language singers of South Korea
Living people
People from South Jeolla Province
Super Junior members
Super Junior-M members
Donghae & Eunhyuk members
South Korean male idols
South Korean singer-songwriters
South Korean pop singers
South Korean male singers
South Korean male film actors
South Korean pianists
South Korean radio presenters
South Korean rhythm and blues singers
South Korean male television actors
South Korean television presenters
21st-century South Korean singers
Male pianists
South Korean male singer-songwriters